The single name Lochan na h-Earba is applied to two lochs to the south of Loch Laggan in Highland, Scotland, close to the historic boundary between Lochaber and Badenoch. It is thought that the two lochs once formed a single loch, but became separated by the build up alluvial deposits from the Moy Burn, which now joins the short watercourse that connects the two lochs. Ordnance Survey maps of the area show a single name printed across both lochs. They occupy a narrow glen running southwest to northeast, and roughly parallel with Loch Laggan, from which they are separated by the Binnein Shuas range of hills. The Munros of Geal Charn and Creag Pitridh are the highest peaks of the hills to the southeast.

The lochs lie on the Ardverikie Estate. They have been used as the location for several film and television productions, most frequently appearing regularly in the BBC series Monarch of the Glen, which was largely filmed in and around the Laggan area. Scences from Mrs Brown and Outlander have also been filmed here.

Both lochs were fully surveyed by the Bathymetrical Survey of the Fresh-Water Lochs of Scotland in 1902.

The west loch
It is fed by numerous small burns, with the most significant being those descending from Beinn a' Chlachair.

The east loch

The east loch is fed chiefly by the outflow from the west loch, to which it is connected by a short watercourse.

References

Laggan
Laggan
Lochy Basin